Skullduggery or Skulduggery may refer to:

Film and television
 Skullduggery (1970 film), an American adventure film starring Burt Reynolds
 Skullduggery (1983 film), a Canadian horror film
 Skullduggery (Kinnikuman), or Kinkotsuman, a character from the anime Kinnikuman
 Skullduggery, a business featured in season 2, episode 5 of The Profit, 2014
 Skull Duggery, a character from the first two episodes of Speed Racer, 1967

Other uses
 Skullduggery (album), a 1976 album by Steppenwolf
 Skull Duggery (rapper) (1971–2022), American rapper
 Skullduggery (board game), a children's logic and strategy game
 Skulduggery (role-playing game), a 2010 game by Robin D. Laws
 Skulduggery, the skeleton detective from the children's book series Skulduggery Pleasant by Derk Landy

See also